The 1961 Kent State Golden Flashes football team was an American football team that represented Kent State University in the Mid-American Conference (MAC) during the 1961 NCAA University Division football season. In their 16th season under head coach Trevor J. Rees, the Golden Flashes compiled a 2–8 record (1–5 against MAC opponents), finished in seventh place in the MAC, and were outscored by all opponents by a combined total of 181 to 126.

The team's statistical leaders included Cullen Bowen with 275 rushing yards, George Jenkins with 387 passing yards, and Dick Wolf with 288 receiving yards.

Schedule

References

Kent State
Kent State Golden Flashes football seasons
Kent State Golden Flashes football